Neuregulin 2, also known as NRG2, is a protein which in humans is encoded by the NRG2 gene.

Function 

Neuregulin 2 (NRG2) is a novel member of the neuregulin family of growth and differentiation factors. Through interaction with the ErbB family of receptors, NRG2 induces the growth and differentiation of epithelial, neuronal, glial, and other types of cells. The gene consists of 12 exons and the genomic structure is similar to that of neuregulin 1 (NRG1), another member of the neuregulin family of ligands. NRG1 and NRG2 mediate distinct biological processes by acting at different sites in tissues and eliciting different biological responses in cells. The gene is located close to the region for demyelinating Charcot-Marie-Tooth disease locus, but is not responsible for this disease. Alternative transcripts encoding distinct isoforms have been described.

References

Further reading

Neurotrophic factors